Robert 'Robbie' Alistair Heywood (born 30 July 1994) is an English former first-class cricketer.

Early life and career 
Heywood was born at Basingstoke in July 1994.  He was educated at Lord Wandsworth College, before going up to Worcester College, Oxford.  While studying at Oxford, he made a single appearance in first-class cricket for Oxford University against Cambridge University in The University Match of 2016 at Oxford.  Batting twice in the match, he was dismissed in the Oxford first innings for 13 runs by Ruari Crichard, while in their second innings he was dismissed for 21 runs by Angus Dalgleish.

References

External links

1994 births
Living people
People from Basingstoke
People educated at Lord Wandsworth College
Alumni of Worcester College, Oxford
English cricketers
Oxford University cricketers